Jeffrey Paul von Arx (born in Bellefonte, Pennsylvania, raised in Locust Valley, New York) was the 8th President of Fairfield University. He served as the President of Fairfield University from July 1, 2004 until December 31, 2016. Previously, von Arx served as Chair of the History Department at Georgetown University and Dean of Fordham College at Rose Hill. In 2017, von Arx was appointed superior of John LaFarge House, the Jesuit house of studies in Cambridge, Massachusetts. He was the Thomas I Gasson, S.J. Professor at Boston College for the academic year 2018-2019 and is presently Visiting Professor of the History of Christianity at the Boston College School of Theology and Ministry.

Biography
He graduated from the Locust Valley Schools in 1965 and Princeton University in 1969 and entered the Society of Jesus that summer. He subsequently earned an M.A. and M.Phil. in history at Yale University, and completed his Ph.D. there in 1980. A year later, Fr. von Arx received an M.Div. from the Weston Jesuit School of Theology and was ordained a priest.

A noted scholar and historian, he is an expert in the field of 19th-century British history. He is the author of several articles and books titled Progress and Pessimism: Religion, Politics and History in Late Nineteenth Century Britain (Harvard University Press, 1985) and Varieties of Ultramontanism (Catholic University Press, 1998).  He is a Fellow of the Royal Historical Society.

External links
Profile of Rev. Jeffrey P. von Arx, S.J.
Rev. Jeffrey P. von Arx, S.J., the 8th President of Fairfield University (2004 - present)

Living people
Presidents of Fairfield University
20th-century American Jesuits
21st-century American Jesuits
21st-century American historians
21st-century American male writers
Boston College School of Theology and Ministry alumni
Georgetown University faculty
Fordham University faculty
Princeton University alumni
Yale Graduate School of Arts and Sciences alumni
People from Locust Valley, New York
1944 births
Historians from New York (state)
American male non-fiction writers